Events in the year 1635 in the Spanish Netherlands and Prince-bishopric of Liège (predecessor states of modern Belgium).

Incumbents

Habsburg Netherlands
Monarch – Philip IV, King of Spain and Duke of Brabant, of Luxembourg, etc.

Governor General – Cardinal-Infante Ferdinand of Austria

Prince-Bishopric of Liège
Prince-Bishop – Ferdinand of Bavaria

Events
January
 28 January – Joyous entry into Ghent of Cardinal-Infante Ferdinand of Austria as new governor general, Gaspar de Crayer playing a key role in the monumental decorations.

February
 Panel of experts at University of Louvain decrees that tobacco has no nutritional value.
 8 February – French-Dutch treaty to partition the Spanish Netherlands, preliminary to the Franco-Spanish War (1635–59).

March
 26 March – Ferdinand seizes Trier and has Archbishop-Elector Philipp Christoph von Sötern imprisoned.

April
 11 April – Formal representations from Balthazar Gerbier, English resident in Brussels, about Dunkirkers interfering with English shipping.
 17 April – Joyous entry into Antwerp of Cardinal-Infante Ferdinand of Austria as new governor general, Gaspar Gevartius co-ordinating the reception and Peter Paul Rubens playing a key role in the monumental decorations.

May
 2 May – Great Council of Mechelen condemns Guillaume III de Melun, prince of Epinoy, in absentia as a traitor for his role in the Conspiracy of Nobles (1632).
 20 May – Battle of Les Avins: French forces defeat a detachment of the Army of Flanders commanded by Thomas of Savoy, sent to prevent them linking up with the Dutch.

June
 2 June – French-Dutch manifesto calls on inhabitants of the Spanish Netherlands to rise against their government.
 8 June – Sack of Tienen by combined French-Dutch forces.
 21 June – French-Dutch army crosses the Dijle near Overijse.
 24 June – Siege of Leuven commences.

July
 4 July – Siege of Leuven raised.
 22 July – Gaspard Nemius consecrated bishop of Antwerp in Antwerp Cathedral.
 28 July – Army of Flanders takes Schenkenschans.

Publications
 Robert Bellarmine, An ample Declaration of the Christian Doctrine, translated by R. H. (Mechelen, Henry Jaye).
 Cornelius Jansen, Mars Gallicus ([Leuven, Jacobus Zegers]). On Google Books
 Discours sur la rencontre du temps et des affaires presente par un vieulx cavalier francois a monseigneur le duc Dorleans (Brussels, Jean Pepermans). Available on Google Books
 Lettre de sa Majesté Imperiale a son agent a Rome, contenant les raisons pour lesquelles il a faict la paix avec le Duc de Saxe M. DC. XXXV (Brussels, Jean Pepermans).

Works of art
 Peter Paul Rubens
 The Dance of the Villagers, now in the Prado Museum, Madrid
 The Village Fête, now in the Louvre Museum, Paris
 Helena Fourment with Her Son Frans, now in the Alte Pinakothek, Munich
 The Feast of Venus, now in the Kunsthistorisches Museum, Vienna

Births
Date uncertain
 Francis van Bossuit, sculptor (died 1692)
 Daniel Danielis, composer (died 1696)
 Joannes Florentius a Kempis, composer (died after 1711)
 Joseph Roettiers, medallist (died 1703)

January
 10 January – Alexander Farnese, Prince of Parma, Governor of the Habsburg Netherlands 1678–1682 (died 1689)

March
 10 March – Jan van Buken, painter (died 1690)

August
 30 August – Pieter Spierinckx, painter (died 1711)

Deaths
Date uncertain
 Jean-Baptiste Gramaye (born 1579), historian
 Marquis of Aytona (born 1586), former acting governor-general of the Spanish Netherlands
 William Trumbull (born around 1575), former English ambassador to Brussels

February
 5 February – Joos de Momper (born 1564), painter

October
 on or shortly after 24 October – Willem van Nieulandt II (born 1584), painter and poet

November
 11 November – Paul Boudot (born 1571), bishop

References